Jessica White (born June 21, 1984) is an American fashion model, actress and television personality. She is best known for being a Victoria's Secret runway model, Maybelline spokesperson and working for CoverGirl, as well as her appearances in the Sports Illustrated Swimsuit Issues. Outside of modeling, she has appeared on several television series, such as The Young and the Restless, America's Next Top Model, Famously Single, Zoe Ever After and Hip Hop Squares.

Early life
White was born on June 21, 1984 in Buffalo, New York. Her father was a pastor and she sang in a church-driven girl group as a child. She attended Kensington High School.

Career
At the age of 12, White was scouted in her hometown of Buffalo, New York, and had gone to Personal Best modeling school at age sixteen. After modeling for one week, her first job was an editorial for Vogue after meeting Anna Wintour. In Paris, she signed a contract with international modeling agency IMG Models. She has modeled for several magazines, including Sports Illustrated, W, Harper's Bazaar, Teen Vogue, King and Maxim. She has walked the runway for Philipp Plein, Victoria's Secret, Alice Roi, Baby Phat, Oscar de la Renta, Tracy Reese, Zang Toi, Sonia Rykiel, Alberta Ferretti, Ralph Lauren, Marc Jacobs and DKNY. She has appeared in advertisements for Chloé, CoverGirl, Gap, Maybelline, RocaWear and Tommy Jeans. She has also modeled for Joanne Gair's body painting works in these editions.

She has appeared in music videos for Big & Rich ("Comin' To Your City"), John Legend, Jay-Z ("Change Clothes"), Robin Thicke ("The Sweetest Love"), and Trey Songz ("Neighbors Know My Name"). White had a small role as Bra Model in the crime comedy film Big Momma's House 2 (2006). In 2008, she appeared as herself in two episodes of CBS's soap opera The Young and the Restless. On October 14, 2009, White appeared as a guest judge on America's Next Top Model. She appeared on E!'s reality television series Famously Single, which premiered on June 14, 2016. The series follows eight single celebrities who all move in together and try to solve their romantic relationships. She landed the role of Tammi in the romantic comedy film The Perfect Match (2016). The film grossed over $10 million worldwide.

White wrote and produced her debut single, "Bipolar Love", released under her stage name "Jypsy" on June 21, 2016.

Philanthropy 
White has created a women's philanthropic organization, Angel Wings Foundation.

Personal life
White has given interviews about her cocaine addiction and her mental illness. She used cocaine to cope with the problems her mother had. She overdosed on cocaine at 20 after her battle with depression.

She is now off cocaine and considers her mother to be her best friend.

As a child she witnessed violence and was molested by a family member.
She looks to modeling as her savior saying "[it allowed me] to leave and travel to Paris and New York when I could finally relax and be out of the abusive environment."

In October 2010, White was arrested for assaulting a woman in New York City.

Filmography

References

External links
 
 
 Sports Illustrated Swimsuit Collection:  Jessica White

1984 births
Living people
African-American actresses
Female models from New York (state)
African-American female models
African-American models
People with bipolar disorder
Actresses from Buffalo, New York
21st-century African-American people
21st-century African-American women
20th-century African-American people
20th-century African-American women